Kidderpore College is an undergraduate liberal arts & commerce college under the University of Calcutta, in Kolkata, West Bengal, India. The address is 2, Pitamber Sircar Lane, Kolkata - 700023.

About college
The college offers three years' Bachelor's Degree Courses (General and with Honors) in different subjects, mainly from Arts and Commerce streams. From Science stream, one can study here Economics as an Honors subject and Mathematics in General Course.

See also 
List of colleges affiliated to the University of Calcutta
Education in India
Education in West Bengal

References

External links
 The Website of Kidderpore College

University of Calcutta affiliates
Educational institutions established in 1966
1966 establishments in West Bengal